Hwang Sun-hee (born August 15, 1986) is a South Korean actress.

Career
After supporting roles in the miniseries Sign, City Hunter and Wild Romance, she played her first leading role in the daily drama Love, My Love.

In May 2022, Hwang signed with new agency SidusHQ.

Filmography

Film

Television series

Theatre

Awards and nominations

References

External links

South Korean television actresses
South Korean film actresses
1986 births
Living people
IHQ (company) artists